The Reredos of Our Lady of Light is a historic stone reredos carved in 1761 in Santa Fe, New Mexico. It was originally installed in the Chapel of Our Lady of Light on the Plaza and is presently housed in Cristo Rey Church, which was built for that purpose in 1940. Described as "the only one of its kind from the Spanish period in the United States" and "definitely one of the most extraordinary pieces of ecclesiastical art in the country", it was added to the National Register of Historic Places in 1970.

Description
It was carved from soft, white volcanic stone quarried near Pojoaque and was originally painted, though only traces of color remain. Reliefs carved into the stone depict a variety of religious iconography. At the crown of the reredos, God appears above the Mother and child (Our Lady of Valvanera). In the next tier of carvings, St. James the Apostle, the patron saint of Spain, appears in the center as Santiago Matamoros, a warrior on horseback attacking enemy infidels. This depiction held symbolic resonance for the Spanish conquistadores and was consequently widely used in New Mexico and other Spanish colonies. The image of James is flanked by St. Joseph with the infant Jesus on the left and St. John Nepomuk, the protector of the Jesuits, on the right.

The bottom row of carvings depicts St. Ignatius Loyola on the left and St. Francis Solano on the right. In the center is a niche that originally housed an oil painting of Our Lady of Light. When the reredos was moved to Cristo Rey Church in 1940, the stone slab that formerly adorned the front of La Castrense was placed in the niche. This depicts Our Lady of Light holding the infant Jesus while rescuing a human figure from the clutches of Satan. Some of the iconography is unusual in that it depicts Jesuit and Benedictine figures rather than strictly those of the Franciscans, who were responsible for most of the Spanish colonial churches in New Mexico.

History
The Chapel of Our Lady of Light, or La Castrense, was a military chapel on the south side of the Santa Fe Plaza which was built in 1760 by Governor Francisco Antonio Marín del Valle. To complete the interior of the chapel, Marín del Valle brought masons from Zacatecas, Mexico to carve a massive stone reredos. Archaeological investigations of the chapel site found chips of the same stone, suggesting that the carving took place on site. The building of the chapel was observed by Bishop of Durango Pedro Tamarón y Romeral during his visit to New Mexico in 1760; he wrote

A later visitor, Fray Atanasio Domínguez, recorded a very detailed description of the chapel in 1776. As to the reredos, he wrote

Ultimately, although highly critical of many of the churches he visited in New Mexico, Domínguez conceded "Its interior is very attractive." The chapel remained in use by Spanish, and later Mexican, troops stationed in Santa Fe until the 1830s. The chapel was last regularly used during the first term of Governor Manuel Armijo (1827−29), who attended services in full uniform along with the military garrison. However, the Mexican government later withdrew its financial support for military chaplains and La Castrense was left empty, eventually falling into disrepair. By the time the U.S. Army occupied the city in 1846, the roof had fallen in and bones were sticking out of the earthen floor. The army repaired the chapel and turned it into a storehouse.

When Jean-Baptiste Lamy arrived in Santa Fe as its new Vicar Apostolic in 1851, one of his first tasks was to take control of La Castrense and other property that he saw as rightfully belonging to the church. The Territorial Legislature had vowed not to interfere but Grafton Baker, the Chief Justice of the New Mexico Supreme Court, was opposed to handing over the chapel and drunkenly declared that he would hang Lamy if he tried to take it. This created an uproar in the heavily Catholic city and Baker, fearing for his own safety, was forced to back down. Lamy tried for a few years to revive the chapel, but without much success, and ended up selling it in 1859 to raise money for his new cathedral project. The building was converted into a store and remained standing at least until the 1870s, though it was later demolished. When the site was cleared for a new building in 1955, the foundations of La Castrense were uncovered and studied by archaeologists.

Before disposing of the chapel, Lamy had the reredos and a stone medallion from the facade removed and transferred to La Parroquia, the main parish church of Santa Fe at the time. Later this church was replaced by St. Francis Cathedral. Once the cathedral was completed, the reredos was consigned to a small room behind the altar away from public view. In 1940, it was moved to the new Cristo Rey parish church on Canyon Road, which was built specifically to house it, and has remained there since. The church was designed by noted New Mexico architect John Gaw Meem.

See also
National Register of Historic Places listings in Santa Fe County, New Mexico

References

Roman Catholic churches in Santa Fe, New Mexico
Churches on the National Register of Historic Places in New Mexico
Religious buildings and structures completed in 1760
Roman Catholic churches in New Mexico
Spanish-American culture in Santa Fe, New Mexico
Spanish missions in New Mexico
National Register of Historic Places in Santa Fe, New Mexico